State Route 63 (SR 63) is an east–west state highway in the northern portion of eastern Tennessee. It goes from U.S. Route 27 (US 27) in Huntsville to SR 33 in Sneedville, running .

SR 63 is a primary route west of US 25E in Harrogate; the portion east of the I-75 junction in Caryville is part of Corridor F of the Appalachian Development Highway System, which stretches from Caryville to Jenkins, Kentucky. East of Harrogate, SR 63 is a much curvier secondary route.

The portion of the highway from US 27 in Huntsville to I-75 in Pioneer is named after Congressman Howard Baker Sr.

Route description

Scott County
SR 63 begins as a primary highway in Scott County in Huntsville at an intersection with US 27/SR 29/SR 297. It begins concurrent with SR 297. It goes east and enters downtown. It then goes through downtown and junctions with SR 456, a short cut to Oneida, before leaving Huntsville. It continues east through rural Scott County and the community of Fairview before crossing into Campbell County.

Campbell County
They then enter the community of Pioneer and SR 297 separates from SR 63 here. SR 63 then continues east alone to intersect Old Hwy. 63, the original route of SR 63 and a direct route to Caryville. It then has an interchange and becomes concurrent with I-75 at exit 141. It goes south along I-75 before entering Caryville. In Caryville, it passes by downtown and then separates from I-75 at exit 134, intersects with the other end Old Hwy. 63, and becomes concurrent with US 25W/SR 9. US 25W/SR 63 immediately afterwards junction with SR 116 (John McGhee Blvd./Old US 25W) and then enters Cove Lake State Park and passes by Cove Lake and Caryville Dam before leaving Caryville. They then enter Jacksboro and becomes the major artery of the city, bypassing downtown to the west and running through the heart of the main business district. They then leave Jacksboro and enter LaFollette. US 25W/SR 63 continue through the center of LaFollette and enter downtown. In downtown, US 25W and SR 63 separate with US 25W heading north towards Jellico and Kentucky and SR 63 heads towards Harrogate and Middlesboro. SR 63 then leaves LaFollette and travels up the Powell Valley through the communities of Fincastle, Well Springs, Speedwell, Powell Valley and Arthur before entering Harrogate, crossing into Claiborne County in between Fincastle and Speedwell.

Claiborne County
In Harrogate, SR 63 passes by the Lincoln Memorial University (LMU) campus then has an intersection and short concurrency with US 25E/SR 32. It then becomes a very curvy secondary route and continues east through a mix of farmland and mountainous terrain to pass through the communities of Forge Ridge and Hopewell before crossing the Powell River and having a junction with SR 345 and crossing into Hancock County.

Hancock County
SR 63 runs parallel to the river for several miles before going through Mulberry Gap and then crossing a mountain pass before entering Sneedville and ending as a secondary highway at an intersection with SR 33.

Major intersections

References

063
Transportation in Scott County, Tennessee
Transportation in Campbell County, Tennessee
Transportation in Claiborne County, Tennessee
Transportation in Hancock County, Tennessee